The Henry P. Gray House is a building in Franklin, Tennessee, United States, dating from .  It was listed on the National Register of Historic Places in 1988.  It shows Greek Revival and Central passage plan architecture.

The property was covered in a 1988 study of Williamson County historical resources.

References

Central-passage houses in Tennessee
Greek Revival houses in Tennessee
Houses completed in 1845
Houses in Franklin, Tennessee
Houses on the National Register of Historic Places in Tennessee
National Register of Historic Places in Williamson County, Tennessee